The speaker of the Parliament of Singapore is the presiding officer of the Parliament of Singapore. The speaker is nominated by the prime minister before being appointed by the Parliament. The speaker is also second in the presidential line of succession. The incumbent speaker is Tan Chuan-Jin, who took office on 11 September 2017. 

Although Singapore is modelled after the Westminster system, unlike their counterpart in the United Kingdom—where the speaker must remain strictly non-partisan and renounce all affiliation with their former political parties when taking office and afterwards, the speaker of the Parliament of Singapore can choose to remain partisan.

The speaker is assisted by two deputy speakers, Christopher de Souza and Jessica Tan, who both took office on 31 August 2020. In the event when the speaker is unavailable, the deputy speakers will preside over the parliamentary session.

Election
Parliament must elect a Speaker at the beginning of each new parliamentary term after a general election. Parliament has the freedom to choose how to elect the Speaker. By recent tradition, the Prime Minister nominates a person for the role. The person's name is then proposed and seconded by the Members of Parliament (MPs), before being elected as Speaker. The Constitution states that Parliament has the freedom to decide how to elect its Speaker.

The Speaker may or may not be an elected MP, but must possess the qualifications to stand for election as an MP as provided for in the Constitution. The Speaker cannot be a Cabinet Minister or Parliamentary Secretary, and must resign from those positions prior to being elected as Speaker.

Once elected, a Speaker continues in office until the dissolution of Parliament, unless the speaker resigns, is appointed as a Cabinet minister, Minister of State or Parliamentary Secretary, or is disqualified from holding their seat as an MP.

Role

The role of the Speaker in Singapore is similar to that in most Commonwealth legislatures. The Speaker presides over the sittings of Parliament, and enforces the rules prescribed in its Standing Orders for the orderly conduct of parliamentary business. In carrying out their duties, the Speaker must remain impartial and fair to all MPs.

The Speaker regulates and enforces the rules of debate. They decide who has the right to speak, and put the question for Parliament to debate on and vote. The Speaker does not take part in the debates, but can abstain or vote for or against a motion if they have a vote, as an elected MP.

As the guardian of parliamentary privileges, MPs look to the Speaker for guidance on procedures, and for rulings on any points of order.

The Speaker is second in the line of succession for the office of President of Singapore. Should the President's office be vacant, and the chairman of the Council of Presidential Advisers is unable to take up the role, the Speaker will assume the duties of the President until a new President is elected. In terms of state protocol, the Speaker sits at the same level as the Chief Justice of Singapore.

The Speaker acts as Parliament's representative in its relations with other legislatures and outside bodies. The Speaker also welcomes visiting dignitaries, and represents Parliament at national events and during official visits abroad. The Speaker is overall in charge of the administration of Parliament and its Secretariat.

The Speaker is one of the few public sector roles which allow its officeholder to automatically qualify as a candidate in the Singapore presidential elections.

List of speakers

List of deputy speakers

See also
Lists of members of parliament in Singapore

Notes

Speakers of Parliament
 
Speakers of the Parliament